Dinaw Mengestu (ዲናው መንግስቱ) (born 30 June 1978) is an Ethiopian-American novelist and writer. In addition to three novels, he has written for Rolling Stone on the war in Darfur, and for Jane Magazine on the conflict in northern Uganda. His writing has also appeared in Harper's, The Wall Street Journal, and numerous other publications. He is the Program Director of Written Arts at Bard College. In 2007 the National Book Foundation named him a "5 under 35" honoree. Since his first book was published in 2007, he has received numerous literary awards, and was selected as a MacArthur Fellow in 2012.

Early life
Dinaw Mengestu was born in Addis Ababa, Ethiopia. In 1978, during a period of political repression that became known as the Red Terror, his father, who was an executive with Ethiopian Airlines, applied for political asylum while on a business trip in Italy; Mengestu's mother was pregnant with him at the time. Two years later, when Mengestu was a toddler, he, his mother and his sister were reunited with his father in the United States. The family settled in Peoria, Illinois, where Mengestu's father at first worked as a factory laborer, before rising to a management position. Later the family moved to the Chicago area, where Mengestu graduated from Fenwick High School in Oak Park, Illinois.

Mengestu received his B.A. in English from Georgetown University, and his MFA in writing from Columbia University in 2005.

Career
Mengestu's début novel, The Beautiful Things That Heaven Bears, was published in the United States in March 2007 by Penguin Riverhead. It was published in the United Kingdom as Children of the Revolution, issued in May 2007 by Jonathan Cape. It tells the story of Sepha Stephanos, who fled the warfare of the Ethiopian Revolution 17 years before and immigrated to the United States. He owns and runs a failing grocery store in Logan Circle, then a poor African-American section of Washington, D.C. that is becoming gentrified. He and two fellow African immigrants, all of them single, deal with feelings of isolation and nostalgia for home. Stephanos becomes involved with a white woman and her daughter, who move into a renovated house in the neighborhood.

Mengestu's second novel, How to Read the Air, was published in October 2010. Part of the novel was excerpted in the July 12, 2010, issue of The New Yorker, after Mengestu was selected as one of their "20 under 40" writers of 2010. This novel was also the winner of the 2011 Ernest J. Gaines Award for Literary Excellence, a literary award established by the Baton Rouge Area Foundation in 2007.

Mengestu's first two novels have been translated into more than a dozen languages.

In 2014, he was selected for the Hay Festival's Africa39 project as one of 39 Sub-Saharan African writers aged under 40 with the potential and the talent to define the trends of the region.

Awards and honors
New York Times Notable Book 2007
 Lannan Fiction Fellowship, 2007 
National Book Award Foundation, 5 Under 35 Award, 2007 
Guardian First Book Award, 2007 
Prix Femina étranger, Finalist, 2007 
 Grand Prix des Lectrices de Elle, Finalist 2007 
Prix du Premier Meilleur Roman Etranger, 2007 
 Dylan Thomas Prize, Finalist 2008 
 New York Public Library Young Lions Award Finalist 2008 
Los Angeles Times Book Prize, 2008 
The New Yorker "20 Under 40", 2010
Vilcek Prize for Creative Promise in Literature, 2011 
 MacArthur Foundation Fellow, 2012 
 2012 Ernest J. Gaines Award for Literary ExcellenceWendland, Tegan.

Bibliography

 
 
 How to Read the Air, Penguin, 2010, 
 All Our Names (Knopf, 2014)

References

External links

 Linda Kulman, "Dinaw Mengestu Captures Immigrant Life", NPR, 19 February 2008.
 Sarah Crown, "Ethiopian-American wins Guardian First Book Award", The Guardian, 5 December 2007
 "Dinaw Mengestu", culturebase.net

American writers of African descent
21st-century American novelists
American male novelists
American magazine journalists
MacArthur Fellows
Georgetown University alumni
Columbia University School of the Arts alumni
Ethiopian emigrants to the United States
Writers from Peoria, Illinois
1978 births
Living people
People from Addis Ababa
21st-century American male writers
Novelists from Illinois
21st-century American non-fiction writers
American male non-fiction writers